The Opernplatz (Opera Square) is a central city square in Frankfurt, Germany, located in the district of Innenstadt (Inner City) and within the central business district known as the Bankenviertel (Banking District). The Opernplatz is the most central square of the Bankenviertel. It is named for the Alte Oper (Old Opera) building, which today serves as a concert hall. The Sofitel Frankfurt Opera hotel is located at Opernplatz 14. The Opera Quarter with some of Germany's most well known luxury shopping streets is located to the east of Opernplatz.

The seven adjacent streets are:

Goethestraße, one of Germany's most exclusive shopping streets
Große Bockenheimer Straße, better known as Freßgass
Neue Mainzer Straße, leading to the centre of the Bankenviertel
Hochstraße
Bockenheimer Anlage
Taunusanlage (Frankfurt Taunusanlage station)
Bockenheimer Landstraße

References

Squares in Frankfurt
Tourist attractions in Frankfurt
Bankenviertel